The PBA All-Star Game is an exhibition game hosted annually by the Philippine Basketball Association (PBA), matching the league's star players using various formats. It is the featured event of PBA All-Star Weekend. The All-Star game was first staged at The ULTRA on June 4, 1989.

The starting lineup for each squad is selected by a fan ballot, while the reserves are chosen by a vote among the head coaches of the league's teams. If a selected player is injured and cannot participate, the league officials select a replacement. The head coaches of the teams that entered the season's first conference, the Philippine Cup, are chosen as the coaches of the teams in the All-Star Game.

Background
The annual All-Star Game was instituted in 1989 and has already evolved into different types of competition, more commonly in the following formats: Philippine national team vs. PBA All-Stars (last played in 2018), Rookies, Sophomores & Juniors (RSJ) vs. Veterans (last played in 2012), and North vs. South match-up (last played in 2019). The manner by which players to the All-Star Game varied through the years. Currently, the two coaches tapped to lead the two All-Star teams were the ones who selected their players but since the mid-2000s the starting five are selected through fan voting and the reserves would now be the ones chosen by the head coaches of all the PBA teams. For the 2005-2006 season, fans from the host city or province were given the choice to select the sixth man of each team. After each game, an All-Star Most Valuable Player (MVP) was chosen by writers covering the annual event.

Vergel Meneses had clearly stamped his mark on this mid-year festivities as he remains to be the only four-time All-Star MVP awardee collecting the award in 1995, 1998, 2000 and 2003.  In its entire history, eight players have been named multiple winners of the All-Star MVP award namely, Meneses, Terrence Romeo (2015, 2017 and 2018), Benjie Paras (1994 and 1999), Asi Taulava (2004 and 2006), Jayjay Helterbrand (2005 and 2007), Arwind Santos (2013 and 2019), Jeff Chan (2013 and 2018) and Matthew Wright (twice in 2017).

Asi Taulava currently holds the record number of All-Star Game appearances with 16.

Types
The league has adopted various formats for the All-Star Game:
Veterans vs. Rookies-Sophomores-Juniors (RSJ): The Veteran team consists of players who have played in the league for four or more years. The RSJ team consists of players who have played in the league for less than four years.
North vs. South: The players' team is assigned according to their birthplaces, and in cases of players born outside the Philippines, on their parents' birth places. Players from Luzon play for the North All-Stars, while those from Visayas and Mindanao play for the South All-Stars.
Philippine men's national team vs PBA All-Stars: The Philippine team consist of PBA players from national pool with a naturalized player or a cadet player if any. The national team usually carries the name of its primary sponsor or its nickname. (e.g. Philippine Centennial Team, Powerade Team Pilipinas, Gilas Pilipinas)
Team A vs Team B: Two All-Star teams with no particular category are formed. This format was used in 1991 (Light All-Stars vs Dark All-Stars) and 2003 (Commissioner's All-Stars vs Governors' All-Stars).
 In 2023, Two All-Star teams will be captained by the top two leading vote-getters, they will pick the players from the list (wherein fans will vote up to 24 players) via draft for their team.

All-Star Game results
This is a list of each All-Star Game, the venue at which it was played, and the Game MVP. Parenthesized numbers indicate multiple times that venue, city, or player has occurred as of that instance (e.g. "Vergel Meneses (2)" in 1998 indicates that was his second All-Star MVP award).

* MVP from losing team
** MVP was Import Player.
*** The two teams requested for an overtime period to be held.

Head-to-head results

References

External links

 
Recurring sporting events established in 1989
Basketball all-star games
1989 establishments in the Philippines
Annual sporting events in the Philippines